Futebol Clube do Porto "Juniors", commonly known as Porto Juniors, is the under-19 football team comprised in the youth department of Portuguese club FC Porto. Based in Olival and Crestuma, two local civil parishes part of the Vila Nova de Gaia municipality, they hold home matches at the club's training complex, CTFD PortoGaia.

Domestically, Porto have won 23 Campeonato Nacional de Juniores titles. Internationally, they won the Blue Stars/FIFA Youth Cup in 2011 and the UEFA Youth League in 2019. In the latter, they became the first Portuguese club to conquer the competition and were also distinguished with the "UEFA's Best Educational Action" award.

Between the department's several development teams, two other youth categories complete the three main age groups, the Juvenis (under-17) and the Iniciados (under-15), who compete in their respective national leagues organised by the Portuguese Football Federation.

Players

Current squad

Key
B = Also integrated in FC Porto B team.

Coaching staff

Competitive record

UEFA Youth League

Note: Porto score is always listed first.

Honours
Portuguese Championship
Winners (23): 1952–53, 1963–64, 1965–66, 1968–69, 1970–71, 1972–73, 1978–79, 1979–80, 1980–81, 1981–82, 1983–84, 1985–86, 1986–87, 1989–90, 1992–93, 1993–94, 1997–98, 2000–01, 2006–07, 2010–11, 2014–15, 2015–16, 2018–19

UEFA Youth League
Winners (1): 2018–19

Blue Stars/FIFA Youth Cup
Winners (1): 2011

Other youth honours
Juvenis (under-17)
Portuguese Championship
Winners (20) – record: 1965–66, 1969–70, 1970–71, 1971–72, 1972–73, 1976–77, 1978–79, 1979–80, 1981–82, 1984–85, 1985–86, 1987–88, 1988–89, 1994–95, 1997–98, 2001–02, 2002–03, 2008–09, 2009–10, 2011–12

Iniciados (under-15)
Portuguese Championship
Winners (14): 1974–75, 1976–77, 1977–78, 1979–80, 1980–81, 1985–86, 1989–90, 1996–97, 1997–98, 1999–00, 2001–02, 2004–05, 2006–07, 2010–11

Infantis (under-13)
Portuguese Championship
Winners (2): 1987–88, 1992–93

See also
FC Porto B

References

External links
 

FC Porto
Porto Juniors
Porto Juniors
Porto Juniors